Tagiades calligana is a species of spread-winged skipper butterflies in the genus Tagiades. It is found in the Indomalayan realm in Thailand, Malay Peninsula, Singapore, Borneo, Sumatra, Java, Nias, Belitung, and Bangka.

References

calligana
Butterflies described in 1879
Butterflies of Asia
Taxa named by Arthur Gardiner Butler